Nile was launched at Nantes in 1795 and was captured or purchased from the French in 1802. She then made four voyages as a slave trader. Between her first and second slave trading voyages she cruised for less than year as a privateer. With the abolition in 1807 of the slave trade, Nile became a regular merchantman, but now trading with Africa. She was sold in Barbados in 1811.

Slave voyages

Slave voyage #1 (1802–1803)
Captain Elijah Belcher sailed from Liverpool on 30 November 1802, bound for Africa to gather slaves. Nile arrived at the Bahamas on 2 June 1803 where he landed 276 slaves. Captain Belcher had left Liverpool during the Peace of Amiens. War with France resumed while Nile was on her voyage. While Nile was at the Bahamas Belcher acquired a letter of marque on 11 July 1803. Nile left the Bahamas on 9 August, and arrived back at Liverpool on 19 September. She had left Liverpool with 32 crew members and suffered one crew death on her voyage.

Privateer
Captain William Hill acquired a letter of marque on 3 November 1803. The doubling of the size of Niles crew and the increase in armament makes it clear that he intended to sail her as a privateer. Nile, Hill, master returned to Liverpool on 8 May 1804 from a cruise. Privateering must have appeared less promising than slave trading.

Slave voyage #2 (1804–1805)
Captain John Gwin acquired a letter of marque on 10 July 1804. (From 1801 to 1802 he had sailed another  on a slave voyage.) Gwin sailed from Liverpool on 27 July 1804, bound for the Congo River. Nile gathered her slaves there and sailed for the Americas on 18 November 1804. Nile arrived at Charleston on 7 May 1805. There she landed 278 slaves. Nile sailed from Charleston on 10 June and arrived back at Liverpool on 9 August. She had left with 33 crewmembers and she suffered three crew deaths on her voyage.

Slave voyage #3 (1806-1807)
Captain John Anderson sailed from Liverpool on 6 March 1806, bound for Calabar. Nile had embarked 290 slaves and she landed 273 at Kingston on 11 November. She sailed from there on 25 January 1807 and arrived back at Liverpool on 8 April. She had left with 30 crew members and she suffered seven crew deaths on the voyage.

Slave voyage #4 (1807-1808)
Captain John Anderson sailed from Liverpool on 1 May 1807. The Act for the Abolition of the Slave Trade took effect on that day, but Nile had already received clearance to sail so her voyage was one of the last legal slave trading voyages. She sailed for Malembo and arrived at Berbice on 18 November 1807. There she landed about 285 slaves. She sailed for Liverpool on 1 March 1808 and arrived there on 19 April. She had left Liverpool with 33 crew members and she suffered two deaths on her voyage. She brought back to Liverpool from Africa and Jamaica a cargo consisting of palm oil, ivory, redwood, coffee, cotton, ginger, hides, and horns.

Merchantman

Fate
On 30 June 1811, Nile, Anderson, master, put into Barbados in a leaky state. She was coming from Gabon and had had to throw her guns and 3000 pieces of redwood overboard. The next report was that Nile had been sold in Barbados.

Citations

1795 ships
Ships built in France
Age of Sail merchant ships of England
Privateer ships of the United Kingdom
Slave ships